Modis may refer to:

People
 Georgios Modis (1887–1975) Greek jurist and politician
 Theodoros Modis (died 1904) Macedonian merchant and politician
 Theodore Modis (born 1945) Greek-Swiss business analyst
 Yorgo Modis (born 1974) Swiss medical researcher

Other uses
 Moderate Resolution Imaging Spectroradiometer (MODIS)
 Modis, an IT solutions subsidiary of HR firm The Adecco Group
 Modis Tower, Wells Fargo Center, Jacksonville, Florida, USA

See also

 Modist
 
 Modi (disambiguation)
 Modia (disambiguation)
 Modius (disambiguation)